Winchester Residential Historic District is a national historic district located at Winchester, Randolph County, Indiana.  The district encompasses 142 contributing buildings, 1 contributing site, and 1 contributing structure in a predominantly residential section of Winchester.  The district developed between about 1837 and 1950 and includes notable examples of Greek Revival, Italianate, Romanesque Revival, Colonial Revival, Prairie School, and Classical Revival style architecture.  Notable buildings include the First Presbyterian Church of Winchester (1903), Winchester Friends Church (1897), First United Methodist Church (1900), Main Street Christian Church (1912), First Church of the Nazarene (1929), Carey Goodrich House (1858), Kizer-Marsh House (c. 1870), and W.E. Miller House (1910).

It was added to the National Register of Historic Places in 2011.

References

Historic districts on the National Register of Historic Places in Indiana
Greek Revival architecture in Indiana
Neoclassical architecture in Indiana
Romanesque Revival architecture in Indiana
Italianate architecture in Indiana
Colonial Revival architecture in Indiana
Historic districts in Randolph County, Indiana
National Register of Historic Places in Randolph County, Indiana
Winchester, Indiana